Percy is a 1971 British comedy film directed by Ralph Thomas starring Hywel Bennett, Denholm Elliott, Elke Sommer and Britt Ekland.

The film is based on the 1969 novel of the same name by Raymond Hitchcock, and features a soundtrack by The Kinks. It was followed by a 1974 sequel, Percy's Progress.

Plot
Edwin (Bennett), an innocent and shy young man, is hit by a nude man falling from a high-rise building while carrying a chandelier. Edwin's penis is mutilated in the accident and has to be amputated; the falling man is killed.

Edwin becomes the recipient of the world's first penis transplant: he receives the very large penis of the womanizer killed in the same accident. With his new bit of anatomy (which he names "Percy"), Edwin follows the womanizer's footsteps, meeting all his women friends, before settling happily with the donor's mistreated widow.

Cast

Production
Producer Betty E. Box discovered the novel when she and director Ralph Thomas were meeting a publisher about optioning the film rights for another book. They were not available at the time, but the publisher gave them a manuscript by Raymond Hitchcock about a penis transplant. Box took it back to the office to read. "I zipped through it, laughing aloud as I read", she wrote. "Very unusual. I might sometimes smile at a book, but I hadn't laughed like this since I read Richard Gordon's Doctor in the House."

Ralph Thomas enjoyed the book too so they decided to option the rights. These ended up costing four times more than Box originally thought after Hichcock had his own agent, as opposed to the publisher, do the negotiations. Box and Thomas paid for the rights themselves "not without a fair amount of heart-searching", Box wrote, "as we didn't expect it to be a straightforward financing operation – with the amount required to make a film it seldom is – but this was certainly not a subject I expected Rank, our traditional partners, to finance. They very soon turned it down without even reading it."

Finance was obtained from Nat Cohen at EMI Films - they provided the entire budget. The poster was designed by John Troke, a publicist who had introduced Box to the book of Doctor in the House 15 years earlier. A script was prepared by Hugh Leonard while Thomas and Box filmed Doctor in Trouble. The film was shot at Elstree Studios and on location in London. The film's sets were designed by the art director Robert Jones. Ray Davies of The Kinks wrote the film's soundtrack Percy.

During the making of the film, another comedy about a penis was being shot, The Statue. Box always regarded this as a rip off.

Release
The film was not screened in Australia until the "R" certificate was introduced.

Box office
Percy was the 8th most popular film at the British box office in 1971. By June 1972, it had earned EMI a profit of £43,000. Eventually, according to Nat Cohen, it made a profit of £500,000.

Box says that Raymond Hitchcock was delighted with the film and thought Hywel Bennett was very close to his original James Anthony.

Thomas and Box agreed to make a sequel provided Nat Cohen finance a film they wanted to make about the Byron-Shelley story, The Reckless Years. However Cohen reneged on the deal and only made the sequel.

References

External links 

1971 films
1970s sex comedy films
British comedy films
British sex comedy films
Films shot at EMI-Elstree Studios
Films directed by Ralph Thomas
Metro-Goldwyn-Mayer films
Films about organ transplantation
Films produced by Betty Box
EMI Films films
Films based on British novels
1971 comedy films
Films set in London
Films shot in London
Films with screenplays by Hugh Leonard
Films with screenplays by Terence Feely
1970s English-language films
1970s British films